Deinandra clementina, known by the common name island tarplant, is a species of flowering plant in the family Asteraceae, endemic to the Channel Islands of California.

Range
Deinandra clementina is found in all of the Channel Islands except San Miguel and Santa Rosa.

Description
Deinandra clementina is a sprawling shrub with a woody base, thick leaves and small yellow flowers. It forms thick mats scattered  in coastal sage shrub on east and middle Anacapa Island where its acid-green foliage is conspicuous from a distance.

References

C.Michael Hogan, ed; 2010; Encyclopedia of Life; Hemizonia congesta overview.

External links
 Calflora Database: Deinandra clementina (Island tarplant) — formerly Hemizonia clementina.
U.C. Photos gallery: Deinandra clementina — formerly Hemizonia clementina.

clementina
Endemic flora of California
Natural history of the California chaparral and woodlands
Natural history of the Channel Islands of California
Flora without expected TNC conservation status